Piotr Szmidt (born December 24, 1982 in Warsaw), better known by his stage name Ten Typ Mes, is a Polish rapper and record producer.

Discography

References

1982 births
Living people
Polish record producers
Rappers from Warsaw
Polish keyboardists
Polish atheists
Former Roman Catholics